Diego Costa Silva (born 11 May 1979), known simply as Diego, is a Brazilian former professional footballer who played as a goalkeeper.

Club career
Born in Itaqui, Rio Grande do Sul, Diego represented in his country Esporte Clube Juventude, Clube Atlético Paranaense, Fluminense FC and Esporte Clube Santo André. He competed in the Série A with all the clubs, for example being an undisputed starter for the second as it finished second in the 2004 season (45 games).

In 2009, Diego moved to Portugal, where he played for Leixões S.C. and Vitória FC, both in the Primeira Liga. At the end of his second campaign with the Setúbal-based team, he was chosen as best player in the squad.

In June 2012, 33-year-old Diego signed for Azerbaijan Premier League side Gabala FC, on a two-year contract. In his first season at his new club he split starting duties with Anar Nazirov, appearing in a total of 18 official matches – two in the domestic cup – and making his debut on 4 August against Simurq PFC.

Club statistics

Honours

Club
Juventude
Campeonato Gaúcho: 1998
Copa do Brasil: 1999

Atlético Paranaense
Campeonato Paranaense: 2005

Fluminense
Copa do Brasil: 2007
Copa Libertadores: Runner-up 2008

Individual
Bola de Prata: 2002

References

External links

CBF data 
Globo Esporte profile 

1979 births
Living people
Brazilian footballers
Association football goalkeepers
Campeonato Brasileiro Série A players
Campeonato Brasileiro Série C players
Esporte Clube Juventude players
Club Athletico Paranaense players
Fluminense FC players
Esporte Clube Santo André players
Primeira Liga players
Leixões S.C. players
Vitória F.C. players
Azerbaijan Premier League players
Gabala FC players
Brazilian expatriate footballers
Expatriate footballers in Portugal
Expatriate footballers in Azerbaijan
Brazilian expatriate sportspeople in Portugal
Brazilian expatriate sportspeople in Azerbaijan